M for Empathy is the third studio album by musician Hannah Read under the name Lomelda. It was released in March 2019 under Double Double Whammy.

Track listing

References

2019 albums
Double Double Whammy albums